Jerry Harvey may refer to:

 Jerry Harvey (screenwriter) (1949–1988), American screenwriter and film programmer
 Jerry Harvey (inventor) (born 1961), audio engineer

See also
Gerry Harvey (born 1939), Australian entrepreneur
Jeremy Harvey (disambiguation)